Wallace Michael Shawn (born November 12, 1943) is an American actor, playwright, and essayist. His film roles include Wally Shawn (a fictionalized version of himself) in My Dinner with Andre (1981), Vizzini in The Princess Bride (1987), Mr. James Hall in Clueless (1995) and the voice of Rex in the Toy Story franchise (1995–2019). He has also had roles in six of Woody Allen's films. His television work includes recurring roles as Jeff Engels in The Cosby Show (1987–1991), Grand Nagus Zek in Star Trek: Deep Space Nine (1993–1999), Cyrus Rose in Gossip Girl (2008–2012), and Dr. John Sturgis in Young Sheldon (2018–present).

His plays include the Obie Award–winning Aunt Dan and Lemon (1985), The Designated Mourner (1996) and Grasses of a Thousand Colors (2008). He also co-wrote the screenplay for My Dinner with Andre with Andre Gregory, and scripted A Master Builder (2013), a film adaptation of the play by Henrik Ibsen, in which he also starred. Haymarket Books published his books Essays (2009) and Night Thoughts (2017).

Early life
Shawn was born on November 12, 1943, in New York City, to a Jewish family. His parents were journalist Cecille (née Lyon; 1906–2005) and William Shawn (1907–1992), the longtime editor of The New Yorker. He has two younger twin siblings: composer Allen Shawn, and Mary, who is severely autistic and lives in an institution.

Shawn attended The Putney School, a private liberal arts high school in Putney, Vermont. He graduated with a Bachelor of Arts in history from Harvard College. He studied philosophy, politics and economics, as well as Latin, at Magdalen College, Oxford, originally intending to become a diplomat. He also traveled to India as an English teacher on a Fulbright program. He taught Latin in Manhattan, but since 1979 he has made his living primarily as an actor.

Career

Playwright
Shawn's early plays, such as Marie and Bruce (1978), portrayed emotional and sexual conflicts in an absurdist style, with language both lyrical and violent. In a conversation with Andre Gregory, parts of which were used to create My Dinner with Andre, Shawn said these plays depicted "my interior life as a raging beast." Critical response was extremely polarized: some critics hailed Shawn as a major writer, while John Simon called Marie and Bruce "garbage" and Shawn "one of the unsightliest actors in this city." His 1977 play A Thought in Three Parts caused controversy in London when the production was investigated by a vice squad and attacked in Parliament after allegations of pornographic content. Shawn received the Obie Award for best playwrighting in 1974 for Our Late Night.

Shawn's later plays are more overtly political, drawing parallels between his characters' psychology and the behavior of governments and social classes. Among the best-known of these are Aunt Dan and Lemon (1985) and The Designated Mourner (1997). Shawn's political work has invited controversy, as he often presents the audience with several contradictory points of view. He has called Aunt Dan and Lemon a cautionary tale against fascism. Shawn's monologue The Fever, originally meant to be performed for small audiences in apartments, depicts a person who becomes sick while struggling to find a morally consistent way to live when faced with injustice, and harshly criticizes the United States' record in supporting oppressive anti-communist regimes. In 1997, Shawn discussed the political nature of Aunt Dan and Lemon, The Fever and The Designated Mourner in an interview in which he talked extensively about the thematic connections among them, as well as his own views on Marxist, communist and socialist politics, their relevance to American liberalism, and how governmental and individual responsibilities for finding solutions to the dichotomy between rich and poor in the world take hold in his characters. Aunt Dan and Lemon earned Shawn his second Obie Award for excellence in playwrighting in 1986, and The Fever won Best American Play in 1991. Three of Shawn's plays have been adapted into films: The Designated Mourner (basically a film version of David Hare's stage production), Marie and Bruce and The Fever. Vanessa Redgrave stars in The Fever (2004), which first aired on HBO on June 13, 2007.

Shawn has also written political commentary for The Nation, and in 2004 he published the one-issue-only progressive political magazine Final Edition, which featured interviews with and articles by Jonathan Schell, Noam Chomsky, Mark Strand and Deborah Eisenberg. Shawn is credited as translator of Bertolt Brecht's The Threepenny Opera, which opened at Studio 54 in Manhattan on March 25, 2006. He appears briefly in voiceover during "Song about the Futility of Human Endeavor". He published his first nonfiction work, Essays, on September 1, 2009. It is a collection of essays that express his perceptions of politics and other aspects of his life.

Acting
Shawn's involvement with theater began in 1970 when he met Andre Gregory, who has since directed several of his plays. As a stage actor, he has appeared mostly in his own plays and other projects with Gregory. He made his film debut in 1979, playing Diane Keaton's ex-husband in Woody Allen's Manhattan and an insurance agent in Bob Fosse's All That Jazz. His best-known film roles include Earl in Strange Invaders (1983) and Mr. Hall in Clueless (1995). After seeing his performance in My Dinner With Andre (1981), casting director Janet Hirshenson was so fond of his delivery of the word "inconceivable" that she cast him as Vizzini in The Princess Bride (1987). Other roles include Baron Von Westphalen in Southland Tales, Cyrus Rose on Gossip Girl, and Ezra in The Haunted Mansion (2003).

His rare non-comedic film roles include two collaborations with Andre Gregory and Louis Malle: the semi-autobiographical dialogue My Dinner with Andre, and a combined production-and-backstage-drama of Uncle Vanya titled Vanya on 42nd Street. Shawn quite often appears on television, where he has appeared in many genres and series. He has had recurring roles as the Grand Nagus Zek on Star Trek: Deep Space Nine, Stuart Best on Murphy Brown, Jeff Engels on The Cosby Show, Dr. Howard Stiles on Crossing Jordan, Arnie Ross on Taxi, Charles Lester on both The Good Wife and The Good Fight, and a reprisal of his role as Mr. Hall on Clueless (based on the film). He appeared in the 1985 music video for Chaka Khan's "This Is My Night". On February 4, 2010, Shawn appeared as Alan Rubin on The Daily Show with Jon Stewart. He appeared in Vegas Vacation as Marty. A Master Builder opened in New York City in June 2014. In 2018, he joined the cast of Young Sheldon in the recurring role of Meemaw's boyfriend and Sheldon's physics professor, Dr. John Sturgis.

Shawn stars in Woody Allen's 2020 film Rifkin's Festival, set in San Sebastian, Spain.

Shawn was honored in 2005 with the PEN/Laura Pels International Foundation for Theater Award as a Master American Dramatist.

Voice acting 
Shawn is a voice actor for animated films and television series, including Rex in the Toy Story franchise, Monsters, Inc. (2001) during the outtakes in the closing credits, Kingdom Hearts III, Mr. Gilbert Huph in The Incredibles, Principal Mazur in A Goofy Movie, Bertram in Family Guy, Munk in Happily N'Ever After, Purple Pirate Paul in Tom and Jerry: Shiver Me Whiskers, and as a caricature of himself in BoJack Horseman.

Shawn said that Toy Story director John Lasseter may have seen both his My Dinner with Andre and The Princess Bride roles and saw him as "excitable" like Rex.

In The Fox and the Hound, he was originally going to voice Boomer, but dropped out and was replaced by Paul Winchell. In Cats & Dogs: The Revenge of Kitty Galore, Shawn replaced Jon Lovitz as the voice of Calico. He also provided the voice of Mr. Mustela in The Addams Family 2 in 2021.

Personal life
In June 2013, Shawn and many other public figures appeared in a video showing support for Chelsea Manning. He referred to himself as a socialist in his essay "Why I Call Myself a Socialist: Is the World Really a Stage?", which was published online and later in his Essays.

Shawn is Jewish and identifies religiously as an atheist. , he lives in the Chelsea neighborhood of Manhattan. He voiced his support for the Palestinian people during the 2014 Israel–Gaza conflict. He is a member of Jewish Voice for Peace and is on the advisory board. His longtime companion is writer Deborah Eisenberg.

Filmography

Film

Television

Video games

Theatre

Musical

Bibliography

References

Further reading

External links

 
 
 
 
 An Innocent Man in Guantanamo with readings by Wallace Shawn at LIVE from the New York Public Library, April 4, 2008
 Lannan Foundation: Wallace Shawn reading of The Fever

1943 births
Living people
Alumni of Magdalen College, Oxford
Jewish American atheists
American male comedians
American male film actors
American male television actors
American male video game actors
American male voice actors
American sketch comedians
American stand-up comedians
American Marxists
American socialists
Audiobook narrators
Collegiate School (New York) alumni
Comedians from New York City
Dalton School alumni
Harvard College alumni
Jewish American male comedians
Jewish American male actors
Jewish socialists
Male actors from New York City
Members of the American Academy of Arts and Letters
New York (state) socialists
People from Chelsea, Manhattan
The Putney School alumni
20th-century American comedians
21st-century American comedians
20th-century American dramatists and playwrights
20th-century American essayists
21st-century American essayists
20th-century American male actors
21st-century American male actors
Fulbright alumni